Earl G. Inmon (born March 21, 1954) is a former American football linebacker. He played for the Tampa Bay Buccaneers in 1978.

References

1954 births
Living people
American football linebackers
Bethune–Cookman Wildcats football players
Tampa Bay Buccaneers players